Grantiopsis is a genus of calcareous sponges belonging to the family Lelapiidae.

References

Calcaronea
Taxa named by Arthur Dendy